Communist Party of Belgium – Marxist–Leninist (Parti Communiste de Belgique - Marxiste-Léniniste), was a small communist party in Belgium. PCB-ML was founded in 1976. PCB-ML published the monthly magazine La Verité (The Truth).

PCB-ML should not be confused with the PCBML of Jacques Grippa and PCB (ML).

Defunct communist parties in Belgium
Maoist organizations in Europe
Political parties established in 1976
1976 establishments in Belgium